Metropolitan Life is a 1978 bestselling collection of comedic essays and the debut book by writer Fran Lebowitz.

The book was released in a 1994 compilation entitled The Fran Lebowitz Reader along with Lebowitz's other bestseller Social Studies.

References

1978 books
English-language books
Debut books
Comedy books
American non-fiction books
Jewish comedy and humor
Books about New York City
Essay collections
E. P. Dutton books
Books by Fran Lebowitz